Come On Marines! is a 1934 American pre-Code drama film directed by Henry Hathaway and starring Richard Arlen and Ida Lupino.

Plot
Ladies' man and devil-may-care U.S. Marine sergeant, "Lucky" Davis is leading a Marine squadron on an expedition through a Philippine jungle where an outlaw bandit is leading a guerrilla-war rebellion. Their assignment is to rescue a group of children from an island mission that has been cut off from all communication. When they arrive, they get a bit of a surprise when Davis discovers that the "children" are a group of 18- to 25-year-old girls blissfully bathing in a pool while awaiting rescue.

Cast
Richard Arlen as Lucky Davis
Ida Lupino as Esther Smith-Hamilton
Roscoe Karns as Spud McGurke
Grace Bradley as Jojo La Verne
Fuzzy Knight as Wimpy
Monte Blue as Lt. Allen
Ann Sheridan as Loretta (billed as Clara Lou Sheridan)
Toby Wing as Dolly
Lona Andre as Shirley

References

External links
 

1934 films
Films directed by Henry Hathaway
1930s English-language films
American black-and-white films
Paramount Pictures films
Films about the United States Marine Corps
Films set in the Philippines
1934 drama films
American drama films
Films based on works by Philip Wylie
1930s American films